Naval Air Technical Training Center may refer to:

Naval Air Technical Training Center Norman, Oklahoma
Naval Air Technical Training Center Ward Island, Texas
Naval Air Station Pensacola, Florida